Sydney Ferries is a metropolitan ferry service operating in Sydney Harbour, connecting a network of 36 wharves on the waterway and its various inlets and tributaries. Currently, Sydney Ferries operates nine distinct service routes across the harbour, all originating from or terminating at Circular Quay ferry wharf, one of only five wharves on the network to be regularly serviced by more than one route, with the other four being Balmain East, Barangaroo, McMahons Point, and Milsons Point, all serviced by both the F3 Parramatta River and F4 Darling Harbour services. The network's extent reaches Parramatta ferry wharf at its most westerly, and Manly ferry wharf at its most easterly.



Wharves

In use

Decommissioned

References
Notes

Citations

External links

 Transport for New South Wales public website

Ferry transport in Sydney
Ferry wharves, Sydney